The European Softball Junior Girls Championship is the main championship tournament between national junior girls softball teams in Europe, governed by the European Softball Federation.

Results

Medal table

See also
ESF Women's Championship

References

External links
European Softball Federation

Softball competitions